Imran Bunjaku (born 18 October 1992) is a professional footballer who plays for Swiss Challenge League side Aarau as a midfielder. Born in Switzerland, he represents the Kosovo national team.

Club career
Before the 2021–22 season, he returned to Grasshoppers after six-and-a-half seasons at Schaffhausen. On 30 August 2021, he moved to Aarau on loan. On June 14 2022, he signed a one year contract with an option to extend with Aarau, after his contract at Grasshoppers was not renewed.

International career
Originating from Kosovo with ethnic Albanian parents and born in Switzerland, Bunjaku was eligible to play for Switzerland, Albania and Kosovo if a national team should be formed, but in March 2011 he answered the call by Albania's Under-21 coach Artan Bushati for a non official friendly tournament held in Slovenia.

He officially gained Albanian citizenship on 26 August 2011 along with his Grasshopper team mate Mërgim Brahimi, in order to compete in the UEFA Under-21 Championship qualifiers.

Since 2014 Bunjaku also received call-up from Kosovo and he made his debut for Kosovo in a May 2014 friendly match against Senegal and has, as of January 2019, earned a total of 3 caps, scoring 1 goal.  However, he yet to make his competitive debut.

References

External links

 

1992 births
Living people
Footballers from Zürich
Kosovo Albanians
Swiss people of Kosovan descent
Swiss people of Albanian descent
Association football midfielders
Kosovan footballers
Kosovo international footballers
Albanian footballers
Albania youth international footballers
Swiss men's footballers
Grasshopper Club Zürich players
FC Schaffhausen players
FC Aarau players
Swiss Super League players
Swiss Challenge League players
Kosovan expatriate footballers
Kosovan expatriate sportspeople in Switzerland
Albanian expatriate footballers
Albanian expatriate sportspeople in Switzerland
Expatriate footballers in Switzerland